Drive (Original Motion Picture Soundtrack) is the soundtrack album to the 2011 American film of the same name. Initially, Johnny Jewel was hired to compose the film's score, but producers ultimately hired  Cliff Martinez to replace Jewel. The album consists of songs which is a blend of electronic, ambient and retro music.

Prior to the release of the soundtrack, the album topped iTunes charts after the highly positive critical response for the film as well as its musical score. The album was released on CD on September 19, 2011, by Lakeshore Records, which was followed by a vinyl edition of the soundtrack, marketed by Mondo, was released in June 2012. Coinciding the film's fifth anniversary, Lakeshore and Invada Records, in September 2016, released the special edition of the soundtrack. It peaked at 30th position on the US Billboard 200, and topped the soundtrack list from Billboard. Incidentally, the album also topped the soundtrack list in Official Charts Company (United Kingdom). The soundtrack also received several awards and nominations.

Development 
Refn chose Johnny Jewel of Desire and Chromatics to score the film. He wanted electronic music and to have it be abstract, on occasion, so viewers can see things from the Driver's perspective. As Refn was going through mixer Jewel's catalog, he picked out "Under Your Spell" and "Tick of the Clock" because he thought of Drive being a fairy tale. During Drives climax, "A Real Hero"'s keynote melody, about becoming "a real human being, and a real hero", refrains because that is when the Driver displays both those characteristics. At first, Jewel worried that "Under Your Spell" might be too literal, but soon realized it is used in Drive "in the exact same way that I was feeling it when I wrote it. He definitely got the nuance of the song, and understood what it was supposed to mean, and he wanted to give that emotion to the viewer, that same feeling."

Thinking of music in terms of basic elements, Jewel would tell the director that for certain scenes, it should not have bass since, as an earth tone, it is usually used for a more emotional or ominous part. Jewel thought the music should be in the upper register and relaxing for the "dreamlike" scene. To help himself with the music composition process, and to conjure up melodies, the producer would highlight many phrases from the novel, then print those words in large font, and hung them on his walls or draw pictures during viewings of Drive.

Although Jewel's music was used in the score, at the last minute the studio hired composer Cliff Martinez to imitate the style and feel of Jewel's bands Chromatics and Glass Candy. Refn gave him a sampling of songs he liked and asked Martinez to emulate the sound, resulting in "a kind of retro, 80ish, synthesizer europop". Editor Mat Newman suggested Drives opening credits song: "Nightcall" by French electronic musician Kavinsky. Most of its ethereal electronic-pop score was composed by Martinez. Refn was a particular fan of his ambient music on the Sex, Lies, and Videotape soundtrack. The score contains tracks with vintage keyboards and bluntly descriptive titles.

Jewel reworked his unused soundtrack for the film into Themes for an Imaginary Film, the debut album by his side-project Symmetry.

Track listing

Reception 
Drive (Original Motion Picture Soundtrack) was released on CD on September 19, 2011, by Lakeshore Records. Prior to that, owing to viral reviews such as those found on Twitter, the soundtrack sold well on iTunes, climbing as high as number four on the sales charts. The album was released on vinyl on June 21, 2012, by Mondo. A re-scored soundtrack for the film was produced for the BBC by Zane Lowe for its television broadcast in October 2014. The soundtrack included original music from Chvrches, Banks, Bastille, Eric Prydz, SBTRKT, Bring Me the Horizon, The 1975 and Laura Mvula.

The album received positive reviews. James Verniere of the Boston Herald graded it an "A", stating, "The cool crowd isn't just watching Drive; they're listening to it, too ... The Drive soundtrack is such an integral part of the experience of the film, once you see it, you can't imagine the film without it." AllMusic reviewer James Christopher Monger selected opening track "Nightcall", "I Drive", "Hammer" and "Bride of Deluxe" as soundtrack's highlights. Mayer Nissim of Digital Spy gave it a four out of five star rating, finding it as important as the film itself. She stated the album's sequence, beginning with non-Martinez songs instead of mixing it up for a more enjoyable listening experience, cost it a star.

In September 2016, Lakeshore and Invada Records released a fifth anniversary special edition pressing of the soundtrack, featuring new liner notes and artwork. That same month, Johnny Jewel, college, Electric Youth, and Cliff Martinez discussed the impact of the soundtrack and film on their lives and contemporary music culture. Jewel told Aaron Vehling that Drives "blend of sonic and visual nostalgia with a contemporary spin is always deadly." The soundtrack was listed on Spin magazine's list of 40 Movie Soundtracks That Changed Alternative Music.

Charts

Awards and nominations

Notes

References

External links 

 

2011 soundtrack albums
Electronic soundtracks
Ambient albums by American artists
Lakeshore Records soundtracks
Action film soundtracks
Drama film soundtracks